Utahime (歌姫) is a cover album by Japanese singer Akina Nakamori. It was released on 24 March 1994 under the MCA Records label. It is Nakamori's first cover album, and her only cover album to be released in the 90s. On the same day the promotional cover single "Kataomoi" was released.

The calligraphy on the album cover was written by Yousui Inoue.

The re-printed version includes instrumental versions of the cover tracks arranged by Akira Senju. In 2002, Nakamori returned to her Utahime cover album series under Universal Music Japan.

Stage performance
In December 1994, Nakamori held a one-night "Utahime Akina Nakamori Live" show in Parco Theatre, where she performed "Aizenbashi", "Watashi wa Kaze", "Shishuuki" and "Dance wa Umaku Odorenai".

Chart performance
Utahime debuted at number 5 on the Oricon Album Weekly Chart, charted for nine weeks and sold over 140,500 copies.

Track listing

References

1994 albums
Japanese-language albums
Akina Nakamori albums
Albums produced by Akina Nakamori